Felipe Alves de Souza or simply Felipe Alves (born March 25, 1982 in Rio de Janeiro),  is a Brazilian defensive midfielder who plays for Resende Futebol Clube.

Club career
He moved to Malavan in summer 2008 and was one of the constant players of the team in his first season. He continued as being one of the main players and attracted the attention of Esteghlal where he signed for them in late May 2010.

Club career statistics
Last update  14 November 2011 

 Assist Goals

1982 births
Living people
Brazilian expatriate footballers
Club Athletico Paranaense players
CR Vasco da Gama players
Expatriate footballers in Belgium
Beerschot A.C. players
Esteghlal F.C. players
Malavan players
Zob Ahan Esfahan F.C. players
Expatriate footballers in Iran
Paraná Clube players
Avaí FC players
Macaé Esporte Futebol Clube players
Persian Gulf Pro League players
Association football midfielders
Footballers from Rio de Janeiro (city)
Brazilian footballers